The Sunset/Sunside is one of the main jazz clubs in Paris, France. It was founded in 1983 and is the first jazz club to settle in the rue des Lombards which hosts several other famous jazz clubs such as Le Baiser Salé and Le Duc des Lombards.

See also
List of jazz clubs

External links
Official site

Jazz clubs in Paris
1983 establishments in France